Joseph Calwell (18 October 1808- 11 February 1882) was a nineteenth century  Irish Anglican priest.

Callwell was born in Dublin  and educated at Trinity College, Dublin.  After a curacy in Newcastle, Dublin he held livings at Newtownmountkennedy, Drummully, Aghavea and Kilskeery. He was  Archdeacon of Clogher from 1871 to 1873.

References

1808 births
1882 deaths
Christian clergy from Dublin (city)
Archdeacons of Clogher
Alumni of Trinity College Dublin